Heather Keckler (born on November 9 in Davenport, Iowa) is an American beauty pageant contestant and dancer. In 1984 she moved to Arizona where she won the title of Miss Arizona Teen USA in 1992. Two weeks after, she competed as a member of the Dance Team for USA in the Summer Olympics of Barcelona, Spain. She graduated from Arizona State University in 1998 with a Bachelor of Science in Human Nutrition and Dietetics. In 2000, she became Miss Arizona and competed in Miss USA during February of the same year.  Keckler's voice is featured in two songs ("The World Needs a Hero" and "1000 Times Goodbye") of Megadeth's 2001 album The World Needs a Hero.

References

People from Davenport, Iowa
Arizona State University alumni
Living people
Miss USA 2000 delegates
20th-century Miss Teen USA delegates
Year of birth missing (living people)
20th-century American people
1992 beauty pageant contestants